The Merchant Marine Defense Medal (Bar) is a decoration of the United States Merchant Marine. The decoration was established by an Act of Congress on August 14, 1944.

Conditions 
The decoration is awarded to members of the Merchant Marine who served aboard United States merchant ships between September 8, 1939 and December 7, 1941.

Design 
Prior to 1992, the Merchant Marine Defense Medal was a ribbon-only decoration; otherwise known as the Merchant Marine Defense Bar.

On May 19, 1992, the U.S. Department of Transportation announced the availability of new medals for civilian merchant seamen, in recognition of their service in World War II, Korea and Vietnam. The medals are being issued to supplement war zone ribbon bars previously awarded to civilian mariners who supported the nation's armed forces in these wars.

The new medal design consists of:

The shield and anchor, from the United States Maritime Service Seal, are superimposed in a ship's wheel, denoting control and maritime service. The laurel branches symbolize achievement and excellence.

See also 
Awards and decorations of the United States government
 Awards and Decorations of the United States Maritime Administration
 Awards and decorations of the United States Merchant Marine
 Awards and decorations of the United States military

References

External links 
 Laws Establishing Merchant Marine Medals

Awards and decorations of the United States Merchant Marine
Awards established in 1944